The Colonial Penn Life Insurance Company (often known as simply Colonial Penn) is an American life insurance company based in Philadelphia, Pennsylvania, founded by philanthropist and AARP co-founder Leonard Davis, owned by CNO Financial Group. Colonial Penn, originally focused on people over 65 who became the origins of insurance provided through American Association of Retired Persons, now known as AARP, now has a marketing campaign that is aimed at people between the age of 50 and 85, specializing in “guaranteed acceptance whole life insurance“ and to help their families cover funeral costs after the individual dies. The company's name comes from the state it was founded (Pennsylvania), which was part of colonial America, hence the name “Colonial Penn”.

History
Utility holding company FPL Group acquired Colonial Penn in 1985. FPL sold Colonial Penn to Leucadia National in 1991.

Conseco bought Colonial Penn from Leucadia in 1997, and in 1998 renamed it Conseco Direct Life to reflect Conseco ownership. In 2001, Conseco reverted to the Colonial Penn name, which remains a subsidiary of the renamed CNO Financial Group with Bankers Life and the Washington National Insurance Company.

Advertising
Colonial Penn is often known for its television commercials that target viewers aged 50 and over. The commercials have frequently aired during The Price Is Right, The Golden Girls, and other classic TV shows as well as newer shows that are mostly oriented towards the elderly. Celebrities have been spokespersons for the life insurance company over the years and are known as “compensated endorsers”. The original spokesman was Ed McMahon. Other spokespeople included Lou Rawls and Joe Theismann, among others.

In recent years, longtime Jeopardy! host Alex Trebek had appeared as an compensated endorser in Colonial Penn commercials, since he started using life insurance from the company in the early 1990s, and signed a long-term contract with it to do advertisements. Trebek would often visit Colonial Penn's headquarters in Philadelphia to meet with employees and representatives and to film commercials. Since 2018, Colonial Penn sales manager Jonathan Lawson has appeared as a pitchman in the commercials while Trebek was unavailable at times due to health issues.

When Trebek died in November 2020, most, if not, all commercials featuring him were removed and were replaced by Lawson on a temporary basis, and the life insurance company's website removed all references to Trebek. Prior to his death, Trebek's estate received royalties from every commercial that he appeared in. A week after Trebek died, Colonial Penn announced that his family will receive benefits and funeral expenses. Also, in the wake of Trebek's death, it is unknown if Colonial Penn will find a new celebrity endorser or if Lawson will be the permanent spokesman for the foreseeable future. Recently, Colonial Penn have aired commercials paying tribute to Trebek.

References
Notes

External links

Insurance companies of the United States
Companies based in Philadelphia
Financial services companies established in 1968
1968 establishments in Pennsylvania
Life insurance companies